Dorothy Ann Malcolm Geddes OBE FRCS (8 May 1936 – 14 March 1998) was the first woman to be appointed to a professorship of dentistry in the United Kingdom.

Life  
Dorothy Ann Malcolm Geddes was born in Alloa, Scotland on 8 May 1936. She attended Brechin High School, going on to study dentistry at the University of Edinburgh, graduating in 1959. She worked for most of her career at University of Glasgow where she was Dean of the Faculty of Dental Surgery. Geddes' specialism was oral surgery. She was the first woman to be awarded Fellowship in Dental Surgery (FRCS) of the Royal College of Surgeons of Edinburgh, in 1963. She was a distinguished teacher and researcher and gained a personal chair. She was President of the Royal Odonto-Chirugical Society of Scotland, President of the West of Scotland Branch of the British Dental Association, and Convener of the Dental Council.

Death and legacy 
Geddes died 14 March 1998. The University of Glasgow established the Dorothy Geddes Multimedia Laboratory to promote the application of new, cutting-edge technology to the teaching of oral biology. The university also awards the Geddes Research Fellowship and medal.

She is remembered as a "modest, quiet woman with a wicked sense of humour, who is remembered with universal affection and more than a little awe".

Awards and honours
 OBE, in 1995
 European Organization for Caries Research Rolex Prize, in 1998

References

1936 births
1998 deaths
Alumni of the University of Edinburgh
Scottish dentists
Academics of the University of Glasgow
Fellows of the Royal College of Surgeons of Edinburgh
Scottish surgeons
Scottish women medical doctors
Women dentists
Members of the Order of the British Empire
Scottish women academics
20th-century surgeons
20th-century dentists